The Sesiinae are a subfamily of clearwing moths, identified by Jean Baptiste Boisduval in 1828.

References 

 
 
 Sesiinae at Fauna Europaea

Moth subfamilies
Sesiidae